The Boy Merlin is a Thames Television fantasy show from 1979, starring Ian Rowlands in the title role, about the magician Merlin. It was inspired by a one-off drama of the same name, broadcast in 1978.

Synopsis
Merlin, the illegitimate son of a princess and the grandson of King Conaan is made unwelcome at court.  He is fostered by a local smith and his wife, from whom he learns the worth of honest labour.  His foster-grandmother, Myfanwy, however is able to see his future, and teaches the boy the magic he will need in King Arthur's service. Unfortunately, the Saxon king, Vortigern, gets wind of Merlin's powers, and his location and takes steps to cause problems for the young magician.

Production
The series was devised by Anne Carlton and was based on an episode of the series Shadows called "The Boy Merlin" (directed by Vic Hughes and broadcast 11 October 1978).

Broadcast
It was broadcast in the UK on ITV in 6 episodes from 23 April to 11 June 1979 (with no episode being transmitted on 7 May owing to Bank Holiday sports coverage) and repeated from 1980/04/11 to 1980/05/16. Previously the 1979 transmissions were claimed to have been cancelled by an ITV strike, however, this is incorrect, as that ITV strike lasted from August to October 1979.

It was also shown in Ireland and Australia.

Cast
 Ian Rowlands - Merlin
 Meredith Edwards - King Conan
 Donald Houston - Dafydd the Smith
 Margaret John - Blodwen
 Rachel Thomas - Myfanwy

DVD release

The series, including the pilot episode, was released by Network DVD on 2 May 2011.

References 

ITV children's television shows
Television series by Fremantle (company)
Television series based on Arthurian legend
Works based on Merlin
Wizards in television
Television shows produced by Thames Television
English-language television shows